Kenji Fusé (born 1965 in Northfield, Minnesota) is a Canadian violist and composer living in Victoria, British Columbia, Canada. He currently holds the position of principal viola with the Victoria Symphony Orchestra. He also teaches at the Victoria Conservatory of Music.

Fusé has premiered the Jacques Hétu Viola Concerto in BC, Canada, with conductor Alain Trudel and the Victoria Symphony Orchestra (2011). He has performed his own viola concerto with the same orchestra, under the direction of both Glen Fast (1993) and the dynamic young Music Director Designate of the venerable Philadelphia Orchestra, Yannick Nézet-Séguin (2005).

References

External links 
 

American emigrants to Canada
Canadian classical violists
Canadian composers
Canadian male composers
Musicians from Victoria, British Columbia
Living people
1965 births
Canadian musicians of Japanese descent